Davis Creek Dam (National ID # NE82901) is a dam located at the county line between Greeley County and Valley County, in the middle part of the state of Nebraska.

The earthen dam was completed in 1991 by the United States Bureau of Reclamation with a height of 153 feet and 2900 feet long at its crest.  It impounds Davis Creek for flood control, part of the North Loup Division of the Bureau's extensive Pick-Sloan Missouri Basin Program.  The dam is owned by the Bureau and is operated by the local Twin Loups Irrigation District.

The reservoir it creates, Davis Creek Reservoir, has a water surface of 1,145 acres and has a capacity of 44,918 acre-feet.  Recreation includes fishing (for largemouth bass, walleye, crappie, yellow perch, etc.), hunting, boating, camping and hiking.  The northern shore borders the Davis Creek State Wildlife Recreational Area.

References 

Dams in Nebraska
Reservoirs in Nebraska
United States Bureau of Reclamation dams
Buildings and structures in Greeley County, Nebraska
Buildings and structures in Valley County, Nebraska
Earth-filled dams
Dams completed in 1919
Bodies of water of Greeley County, Nebraska
Bodies of water of Valley County, Nebraska